E le stelle stanno a guardare is a 1971 Italian adaptation of A. J. Cronin's 1935 novel The Stars Look Down.  It was written and directed by Anton Giulio Majano and was produced by Radiotelevisione Italiana. The miniseries was a massive success, averaging about 20 million viewers per episode.

Cast
 Andrea Checchi: Robert Fenwick
 Orso Maria Guerrini: David Fenwick
 Anna Miserocchi: Martha Fenwick
 Giancarlo Giannini: Arthur Barras
 Anna Maria Guarnieri: Jenny Sunley
 Loretta Goggi: Grace Barras
 Adalberto Maria Merli: Joe Gowlan
 Scilla Gabel: Laura Millington
 Enzo Tarascio: Richard Barras
 Laura Carli: zia Carol
 Roberto Chevalier: Pat Reedy
 Stefano Sibaldi: Macer
 Gioacchino Maniscalco: Ugo Fenwick
 Daniela Goggi: Sally Sunley
 Valentino Macchi: Harry Brice
 Franco Volpi: Bebbington
 Romano Malaspina: Henry Kinch
 Guido Celano: Harry Morris
 Dario Penne: Bert Wicks 
 Gianni Mantesi: Armstrong
 Michele Malaspina: Hudspeth
 Luciano Melani: Nugent
 Silvio Noto: Secondino
 Carlo Alighiero: Secondino

See also
The Stars Look Down (1939 film)
The Stars Look Down (1975 British miniseries)

References

External links

Italian drama television series
Television shows based on British novels
1970s Italian television series
1971 Italian television series debuts
Television series set in the 20th century
Television shows based on works by A. J. Cronin